Development as Freedom is a 1999 book about international development by Indian economist and philosopher Amartya Sen.

The American edition of the book was published by Alfred A. Knopf.

Summary
Amartya Sen was the winner of the 1998 Nobel Prize in Economics. Development as Freedom was published one year later and argues that development entails a set of linked freedoms: 
political freedoms and transparency in relations between people
freedom of opportunity, including freedom to access credit; and
economic protection from abject poverty, including through income supplements and unemployment relief.

Poverty is characterized by lack of at least one freedom (Sen uses the term unfreedom for lack of freedom), including a de facto lack of political rights and choice, vulnerability to coercive relations, and exclusion from economic choices and protections.

Based on these ethical considerations, Sen argues that development cannot be reduced to simply increasing basic incomes, nor to rising average per capita incomes. Rather, it requires a package of overlapping mechanisms that progressively enable the exercise of a growing range of freedoms. A central idea of the book is that freedom is both the end and a means to development.

A key observation in this book is that, "no famine has ever taken place in a functioning democracy."

Canadian social scientist Lars Osberg wrote about the book: "Although Development as Freedom covers immense territory, it is subtle and nuanced and its careful scholarship is manifest at every turn." Kenneth Arrow concluded "In this book, Amartya Sen develops elegantly, compactly, and yet broadly the concept that economic development is in its nature an increase in freedom."

See also
Equality of autonomy
Human development theory

References

Further reading 
 
 
  Pdf version.
 

1999 non-fiction books
Books by Amartya Sen
Development economics
English-language books
International development